Nicolò de' Tudeschi (Panormitanus) (b. at Catania, Sicily, in 1386; d. at Palermo, 24 February 1445) was an Italian Benedictine canonist.

Life

In 1400 he entered the Order of St. Benedict; he was sent (1405-6) to the University of Bologna to study under Zabarella; in 1411 he became a doctor of canon law, and taught successively at Parma (1412–18), Siena (1419–30), and Bologna (1431–32). Meanwhile, in 1425, he was made abbot of the monastery of Maniace, near Messina, whence his name "Abbas", to which has been added "modernus" or "recentior" (in order to distinguish him from "Abbas antiquus", a thirteenth-century canonist who died about 1288); he is also known as "Abbas Siculus" on account of his Sicilian origin. 

In 1433 he went to Rome where he exercised the functions of auditor of the Rota and Apostolic referendary. The following year he relinquished these offices and placed himself at the service of Alfonso V of Aragon, King of Sicily, obtaining the See of Palermo, whence his Latin name "Panormitanus" (Palermo in Latin is Panormus). He was confirmed by Pope Eugene IV on 9 March 1435 and consecrated bishop on 4 July.  

During the troubles that marred the pontificate of Eugene IV, Nicolò at first followed the party of this pontiff, whom he represented briefly at the Council of Basel; but subsequently he allied himself with the antipope Felix V who, in 1440, named him cardinal. Pius II, in an early work, depicts Panormitanus as lamenting that instructions from Alfonso made him oppose quick action to depose Eugene. Panormitanus represented the Council of Basel at imperial diets that discussed the fight between Eugene and the council.

Works

In his "Tractatus de concilio Basileensi" he upheld the doctrine of the superiority of a general council to the pope. This was written for the 1442 Diet of Frankfurt, at which he was opposed by Nicholas of Cusa. It was his canonical works, especially his "Lectura in Decretales" "In Sextum", and "In Clementinas", that won him the title of "lucerna juris" (lamp of the law) and insured him great authority; he also wrote "Consilia", "Quaestiones", "Repetitiones", "Disputationes, disceptationes et allegationes", and "Flores utriusque juris". A fine edition of his works appeared at Venice in 1477; among later, frequent editions, that published in 1617-18 (Venice) in 10 folio volumes is especially notable.  There also is a Lyon 1521-1522 edition of the Decretals commentary.

References
 Knut Wolfgang Norr, Kirche und Konzil bei Nicolaus de Tudeschis (Panormitanus) (Cologne, 1964). 
Schulte, Die Gesch. der Quellen u. Lit. des canonischen Rechtes, II (Stuttgart, 1877), 312-313
Sabbadini, Storia documentata della Reale Universita di Catania (Catania, 1898), 10 sq. 
Brandileone, Notizie su Graziano e su Niccolo de Tudeschis tratte da una cronaca inedita. Studi e memorie per la storia dell' Universita di Bologna, I (Bologna, 1909), i, 18-21.

Notes

1386 births
1445 deaths
Italian Benedictines
15th-century Italian jurists
Canon law jurists
15th-century Italian writers
15th-century Latin writers